Farah ALHashim (also Farrah Zaine) is a Kuwaiti-Lebanese filmmaker and journalist based in Paris. ALHashim has been making films since 2011 including 7 Hours, which won several awards at film festivals in 2013 and Breakfast in Beirut in 2015, which was honored at multiple festivals.

Early life and education
Born in Kuwait and raised between Beirut, New York, London and Los Angeles, she holds a degree in journalism from Lebanese American University and a Master of Fine Arts (MFA) from New York Film Academy.

Awards and Nominations
 "Best Screenplay" at the Women Independent Film Festival Santa Monica in Los Angeles, CA for the short film "7hours" 2013
 "Best Actress" at the Women Independent Film Festival Santa Monica in Los Angeles, CA for the short film "7hours" 2013
 Official Selection on ECU world Tour at Cannes Short corner 2014 for the Film "7hours" 2014 Official Selection at International Arts Expo in Italy for the Film "7hours" 2014
 Official selection at the Cabriolet Film Festival for "7hours" 2014 Official selection at the OnceaweekFilmFestival for "7hours" 2014 "Best Short Film" at the European Independent Film Festival in Paris, France in the Arab World Section for the Short Film "7hours" 2014.
 Official Preview at Metropolis Sofil Theatre for Breakfast in Beirut - (sold out) 2014
 Special Mention for Breakfast in Beirut from the Jury" section In Nour Sherif for Feature Films at Alexandria and Mediterranean Countries Film Festival, Egypt 2015
 "Special Honorable screening" at Made in. Art Gallery in Venice, Italy for Film Breakfast in Beirut 2015
 Honorable award for Breakfast in Beirut by the Ministry of Culture, Beirut 2014
 Official selection at the International Film Festival Lumiere, Rome Italy for Breakfast in Beirut 2016
 Breakfast in Beirut among the top five films representing Beirut in the movies according to LAHA Magazine 2015
 Breakfast in Beirut honorary show at Antoine University, Lebanon 2015
 Nominated "Film of the Year" Breakfast in Beirut at the Lebanese Film Festival in Sydney, Australia 2015 Breakfast in Beirut Art Festival in Venice, organized by Made in Gallery and the Municipality of Treviso as an honorable tribute to the award-winning film Breakfast in Beirut 2016
 Breakfast in Beirut official selection at CultFest in Mastre, Italy 2016
 Official selection at the Okaz Cultural Art Festival October 2016
 Official premiere in Paris at the Cinema Le Brady on April 29, 2016 (full house)
 Official selection at Beirut Women Independent Film Festival 2018 BBC Arabic film of the year for the film "Ces petits riens" in 2018
 Official selection at Beirut Women Independent Film Festival for the film these little things 2019 Official selection at Beirut Women Independent Film Festival for the film "the fifth day" 2020
 Official selection for "Confined to Paris" at the Beirut DC film festival in Beirut and in collaboration with the French Institute of Lebanon, 2020
 Official selection of the film "The Fifth Day" at the Kuwait International Film Festival, 2020 Official selection at the Jerusalem International Film *Festival and winner of the Jury Prize for the film "The Fifth Day" in the Palestinian Territories 2021.
Festival and winner of the Best Film  for the film "Beirut Borhan " in the Palestinian Territories 2022.

Career
In 2013, while working as a diplomatic advisor for Kuwait Mission to the UN in New York, she made her first critically acclaimed short film 7 hours, which toured over 31 cities around the world as part of its award as "Best Arab Short Film" at the European Film Festival in Paris, 2014 for the Arab Category. The film was awarded twice more at the Santa Monica Film Festival in California with the "Best Acting" and "Best Screenplay" awards.

ALHashim has established her own film house, VioletSkye Films, in 2014 in Beirut. The company is registered in Lebanon as a production company dedicated only in creating content for web and cinema and she gives film courses remotely with CAP in Kuwait.

The official Avant Premiere of Breakfast in Beirut was held in 2015 at the Metropolis Sofil Theater in Beirut while the official international premiere was in Paris at Le Brady Cinema in April 2016. Breakfast in Beirut received an honorary recognition by the municipality of Treviso, Italy and in collaboration with the Gallery "Made In" Venice, Italy as they decided to name their art festival “Breakfast in Beirut Art Festival” in honor the film and ALHashem. She also released unedited footage, behind the scenes of the film under a web-series on YouTube entitled "Beirut Secrets" that follows the life of the filmmaker while living in Beirut. Breakfast in Beirut was banned at the Kuwait Film Festival.

In 2018, ALHashim released her second feature film "Ces Petits Riens", which tours International festivals during the fall of 2017 and she also released Women of Kuwait. 
ALHashem started her doctoral thesis at Jean Moulin University in Lyon on the films of Borhan Alaouie. She is set to shoot a documentary about Borhan Alaouie in Beirut and is set to be released in 2022.

Filmography

References

Kuwaiti film directors
Living people
Lebanese film directors
Year of birth missing (living people)
Lebanese American University alumni
New York Film Academy alumni